Sound of Metal is a 2019 American drama film directed and co-written by Darius Marder. It stars Riz Ahmed as a metal drummer who loses his hearing, and also features Olivia Cooke, Paul Raci, Lauren Ridloff, and Mathieu Amalric.  Sound of Metal had its world premiere in the Platform Prize program at the 2019 Toronto International Film Festival on September 6, 2019. Amazon Studios released the film in theaters on November 20, 2020, and on Amazon Prime Video on December 4. The film was critically acclaimed, with particular praise for the performances of Ahmed and Raci, the sound design, the editing and Marder's direction and screenplay. It was listed on 52 film critics' top-ten lists for 2020. At the 93rd Academy Awards, it was nominated for Best Picture, Best Original Screenplay, Best Actor (Ahmed) and Best Supporting Actor (Raci), and won for Best Sound and Best Film Editing.

Plot
Drummer Ruben performs in the avant-garde metal duo Blackgammon with his singer girlfriend, Lou. They live in an RV and tour the United States performing gigs. When Ruben begins to lose his hearing, he goes to a pharmacy seeking a diagnosis. The pharmacist refers him to a doctor, who finds that Ruben has lost most of his hearing and that the rest will deteriorate rapidly. Although cochlear implants may benefit him, insurance does not cover their high cost. The doctor suggests that Ruben eliminate all exposure to loud noises and undergo further testing, but Ruben continues to perform.

Lou wants to stop performing for his safety, but Ruben wants to continue. She is also concerned about his sobriety, as he is a recovering drug addict. They call his sponsor, Hector, who finds a rural shelter for Deaf recovering addicts run by a man named Joe, a recovering alcoholic who lost his hearing in the Vietnam War. Ruben leaves with Lou because they will not let her live there with him, and he wants only the implants. Anxious for his well-being, Lou leaves and persuades Ruben to return to the shelter.

Ruben meets the other members of the shelter, attends meetings, and settles into his new life. He is introduced to schoolteacher Diane and the children in her class and learns American Sign Language. Joe tasks Ruben with writing and sitting peacefully in an effort to make him comfortable with the silence. Ruben joins Diane's class and connects with the children and the rest of the community. He gives the children and Diane drumming lessons.

Joe invites Ruben to stay as an employee of the community. Ruben illicitly uses Joe's office computer to follow Lou's activities and learns she is performing music in Paris. He has his friend Jenn sell his drums and other music equipment, then he sells his RV, using the money for cochlear implant surgery. Ruben asks Joe to loan him money to buy back his RV while he awaits the activation of the implants. Joe refuses, saying that Ruben is behaving like an addict. He asks Ruben to leave the community, as it is founded on the belief that Deafness is not a handicap.

Ruben has his implants activated but is disappointed by their distorted sound. He flies to Paris to meet Lou at the home of her wealthy father, Richard. Richard confides in Ruben that though he initially disliked him, he recognizes that Ruben made Lou happy. Lou has settled into her new lifestyle and has ceased self-harming. At a party, Lou and Richard perform a duet; Ruben's perception of the sound is distorted by the implants.

When Ruben tells Lou he wants to return to their music, she begins scratching her arms. Ruben tells her all is well and that she saved his life. She tells him that he saved hers too. The next morning, Ruben takes his things and leaves while Lou sleeps. In a park, the ringing of a church bell is distorted by his implants; Ruben removes his processors and sits in silence.

Cast

 Riz Ahmed as Ruben Stone, a drummer who loses his hearing
 Olivia Cooke as Louise "Lou" Berger, Ruben's girlfriend
 Paul Raci as Joe, a late-deafened and recovering alcoholic who runs a shelter for deaf recovering addicts
 Lauren Ridloff as Diane, a teacher who helps Ruben learn American Sign Language
 Mathieu Amalric as Richard Berger, Lou's father
 Michael Tow as the Pharmacist

Production
Sound of Metal is directed by Darius Marder, who wrote the story with Derek Cianfrance and who also wrote the screenplay with his brother Abraham Marder. The film originated as the unfinished Cianfrance project Metalhead, which centers on a metal drummer who suddenly becomes deaf. The film featured the members of the band Jucifer portraying themselves. However, the project was later scrapped, until Cianfrance's friend Darius Marder took it up. In January 2016, Dakota Johnson and Matthias Schoenaerts joined the cast of the film, with Marder directing. In July 2018, Riz Ahmed and Olivia Cooke joined the cast of the film, replacing Johnson and Schoenaerts, alongside Mathieu Amalric. Before the casting, Marder had spent 13 years vetting actors who would match his commitment to the film.

A large number of the cast were hired from the deaf community. For eight months, Ahmed prepared for the film by spending two hours a day learning American Sign Language, two hours a day in drum lessons, two hours a day with a personal trainer and the remainder with his acting coach. Marder wanted Ahmed to "trust his instincts" and did not allow him to review dailies of his performance or script analysis.

Sound of Metal was shot in 24 non-consecutive days from early to late 2018. Marder operated on a limited budget, and shot only two takes per scene. The film was shot in the Greater Boston area, primarily in Ipswich, Massachusetts. However, other scenes were shot in Boston, Lynn, Cambridge, Danvers, Framingham, Lawrence, Malden, Rowley, and Topsfield. Filming also took place in Antwerp, Belgium.

Release
Sound of Metal had its world premiere in the Platform Prize program at the 2019 Toronto International Film Festival on September 6, 2019. Amazon Studios acquired U.S. distribution rights to the film the week following its premiere. It was originally scheduled to be released on August 14, 2020, before being postponed due to the COVID-19 pandemic. It was released theatrically on November 20, 2020, and began streaming on Amazon Prime Video on December 4, 2020. Sound of Metal became a part of the Criterion Collection, with a 4K Ultra HD, Blu-ray and DVD released on September 27, 2022.

Critical reception
The site's critics consensus reads: "An evocative look at the experiences of the deaf community, Sound of Metal is brought to life by Riz Ahmed's passionate performance." On Metacritic, the film has a weighted average score of 82 out of 100, based on 36 critics, indicating "universal acclaim".

Sound of Metal received mostly positive reviews from critics. Clarisse Loughrey of The Independent gave the film four stars out of five and praised Marder's direction and Ahmed's performance. Jeannette Catsoulis of The New York Times found the film "underwritten and dramatically muted" but praised Ahmed's performance and Nicolas Becker's sound design. Mark Kermode of The Guardian praised the "astonishing verisimilitude" of the direction and called Ahmed's performance the best of his career. Peter Bradshaw, also writing for The Guardian, credited Ahmed with giving "the film energy and point" but was critical of other aspects, writing that "[the story] perhaps tries to do too much", and that it "telescopes a long story into just a few months." Empire critic Ian Freer praised the sound design and called the film a "powerful but sensitive exploration of a so-called disability that challenges perceptions and assumptions about loss of hearing in thoughtful but provocative ways." Rolling Stone journalist David Fear wrote that the film "immerses you in a noiseless world — but it's the star that makes it speak volumes loudly and clearly". Although enthusiastic about many aspects of the film, metal-themed website The Pit criticized the film's portrayal of metal music, stating that it is "the latest in a long line of Hollywood movies to use metal as a lifestyle that serious characters grow out of."

At the end of the year, Sound of Metal appeared on 52 film critics' top-ten lists for 2020 as the ninth highest-ranked film, including first place on five lists and second place on seven lists.

Accolades

See also
 List of films featuring the deaf and hard of hearing
 Safe listening
 Sudden hearing loss

References

External links
 
 
 
 Sound of Metal – Final Screenplay via Variety

2019 films
2019 drama films
Amazon Studios films
American Sign Language films
American drama films
Films about deaf people
Films about percussion and percussionists
Films about substance abuse
Films postponed due to the COVID-19 pandemic
Films set in Missouri
Films shot in Massachusetts
Films shot in Antwerp
2019 independent films
Films that won the Best Sound Mixing Academy Award
Films whose editor won the Best Film Editing Academy Award
2010s English-language films
2010s American films